Kostromka is a village in Beryslav Raion (district) in Kherson Oblast of southern Ukraine, at about  northeast by north from the centre of Kherson city.

The village came under attack by Russian forces in 2022, during the Russian invasion of Ukraine.

References

Villages in Beryslav Raion